Louis De Revol (1531 – 24 September 1594) was the first French Foreign Minister from 1589 until his death in 1594. He is considered world's first foreign minister entrusted with all foreign relations.

Life and career

He was born in Saint Pierre de Paladru (Isère), the son of Pierre and Marguerite Revol Pelissone. After Henry III created the office, de Revol was appointed its first minister. He had previously served as one of four state secretaries. Revol was the first incumbent of the Ministry and saw the King every day at 5:00 am. Revol oversaw a commis and six clerks.

 Secretary of State of the Maison du Roi from 1588 to 1594 under Henri IV
 Secretary of State for Foreign Affairs from 15 September 1588 to 24 September 1594 under Henry IV
 Secretary of State for War from 1 January 1589 to 1594 under Henry IV

References

External links
From the Louvre to the Quai d’Orsay via France-Diplomatie (includes a portrait)

1531 births
1594 deaths
16th-century French diplomats
16th-century French people
French Foreign Ministers
People from Isère